Lectionary 149, designated by siglum ℓ 149 (in the Gregory-Aland numbering) is a Greek manuscript of the New Testament, on parchment leaves. Paleographically it has been assigned to the 14th century.

Description 

The codex contains Lessons from Gospels and Acts of the Apostles lectionary (Apostolos), on 237 parchment leaves (29.1 cm by 20.3 cm), with one lacunae (the leaf between 155 and 156 lost).
It is written in Greek minuscule letters, in one column per page, 21 lines per page. It is illegible in parts.

History 

The manuscript once belonged to Colbert. The manuscript was examined by Gregory.

The manuscript is not cited in the critical editions of the Greek New Testament (UBS3).

Currently the codex is located in the National Library of France (Gr. 321), at Paris.

See also 

 List of New Testament lectionaries
 Biblical manuscript
 Textual criticism

Notes and references 

Greek New Testament lectionaries
14th-century biblical manuscripts
Bibliothèque nationale de France collections